Westbrooks is a surname. Notable people with the surname include:

Aaron Westbrooks (born 1986), Irish basketball player
Ethan Westbrooks (born 1990), American football player
Greg Westbrooks (born 1953), American football player
Lavelle Westbrooks (born 1992), American football player